Ben Earl (born 7 January 1998) is an English professional rugby union player who plays as a back row for Premiership Rugby club Saracens. He made his England debut during the 2020 Six Nations.

Early life and education
Earl's mother worked as a retail industry CEO and his father as a solicitor. Earl attended The New Beacon and Tonbridge School.

At school level Earl played much more cricket than rugby; he was an all-rounder and played for Kent until he was 15. He also was a serious competitive swimmer until he was 13. He has said he was overweight until age 17. He studied comparative literature at Queen Mary University.

Playing career

Club
Earl started his playing career at Sevenoaks RFC and came through the Saracens academy. He has stated that he prefers the freedom of playing flanker, but also plays Number 8. In November 2016 Earl made his club debut against Gloucester in the Anglo-Welsh Cup and the following season he scored a try on his first Premiership start against Exeter Chiefs. He started for the Saracens side that lost to Northampton Saints in the 2019 Premiership Rugby Cup final.

In 2020 Earl agreed a new contract with Saracens and after it was confirmed the club would be relegated for the 2020-21 campaign he joined Bristol Bears on a season-long loan along with teammate Max Malins. During his loan spell he started for Bristol in the final of the EPCR Challenge Cup as they defeated Toulon to win their first ever European trophy.

International
Earl represented England at under-16 and under-18 level. He was a member of the England under-20 team that completed a grand slam during the 2017 Six Nations Under 20s Championship and scored a try during the opening round against France. He was selected for the 2017 World Rugby Under 20 Championship and scored a try in the final as England finished runners up to New Zealand. The following year Earl captained the team as they finished runners up in the 2018 Six Nations Under 20s Championship and he scored a try in the final round against Ireland.

In May 2018 Earl received his first call-up by coach Eddie Jones to the senior squad for their tour of South Africa and he was subsequently selected for the 2019 Six Nations Championship. Earl was called up again for the 2020 Six Nations Championship and on 8 February 2020 made his Test debut off the bench as a replacement for Sam Underhill against Scotland at Murrayfield. He subsequently played in the final round of the tournament as England won away against Italy to win the competition. Later that year Earl came off the bench as England defeated France in extra-time to win the Autumn Nations Cup.

Honours
England
 Six Nations Championship: 2020
 Autumn Nations Cup: 2020

Club
 EPCR Challenge Cup: 2019-20
 Premiership Rugby Cup runner up: 2018-19

References

External links

England RFU profile

1998 births
Living people
Bristol Bears players
England international rugby union players
English rugby union players
Alumni of Queen Mary University of London
People educated at Tonbridge School
Rugby union flankers
Rugby union number eights
Rugby union players from Redhill, Surrey
Saracens F.C. players